Lex Luthor: The Unauthorized Biography is a one-issue 1989 DC Comics publication.

Synopsis
Peter Sands, a struggling journalist, decides to dig into Lex Luthor's past for an unauthorized biography. However, he must seek Superman's help when Luthor's henchmen come after him.

Plot
In a chalet in Aspen, a woman holding a video tape visits Alex Luthor by helicopter. The video tape shows Clark Kent being interviewed as a criminal suspect.

Detective Hector Ortiz and his partner Ed Harris interview Clark without a lawyer as he knows the interview will prove his innocence. Ed shows Clark photos of a dead man, telling him he was the last person to see him alive.

In a flashback, the dead man, revealed to be Peter Sands, is shown to be an alcoholic and behind on his bills. He makes some calls to various publications but they all turn him down due to his habit of turning up drunk at interviews. A woman named Ellen Fisher phones him and asks if he is working on any books. Sands decides to write an unauthorized biography about Luthor and Fisher gives him the go-ahead.

At the police station, Clark confesses that he only met Sands last night and Ortiz explains that Sands was a journalist like Clark and that he wrote Clark's name on the floor in his own blood.

In a flashback, Sands investigates the library for information about Luthor. He manages to find an autobiography that Luthor wrote years before. The microfiche library provides Sands with years of newspaper articles revealing his Napoleonic scope corporate takeovers.

Clark admits that Sands invited him over by phone because he had info that Clark would want. Clark goes on to explain that Sands was drunk and paranoid and revealed that since he knows too much about Luthor that could put him in prison for life, Luthor now wants him dead.

In a flashback, Sands goes to the slums where Luthor grew up. He finds that Luthor's last recorded teacher, Mrs. Anderson, is still alive and lives in retirement. Anderson tells him that Luthor possessed a genius intellect but was also cruel. She tells him about a rumor that Luthor had paid some men to beat up two students who were always bullying him. Not long after, Lex's parents died and he moved away. He got an insurance settlement for their deaths and became rich.

After several hours Sands finds the insurance company that paid off young Lex. He discovers that Luthor was awarded $300,000. Sands finds the salesman, Mr. Bryant, who tells him his story. Bryant says that when he went to the Luthors to let them know they'd been approved, Mr. Luthor verbally abused him saying that he never ordered any insurance, then threatened to kill him. A couple of days later he received a letter of apology from Mr. Luthor saying he forgot about sending the policy? The next day they were found dead after their car was in a crash. Sands spends the next day tracking down the mechanic.

Peter digs into his past and discovers that he quit two days after Luthor's settlement came in and bought his first auto parts shop immediately afterwards with what Peter suspects was a cut from the policy. Peter then gets a call from someone who does not approve of his research and demand that he stops. 

Still interviewing Clark, Ortiz says that Sand's body was discovered by Superman six hours after Clark left and asks why he waited so long to contact him. Clark tells him he contacted Superman right after he left and that he was home reading a book. Ortiz bets that no one can confirm Clark's claim. 

In a flashback, Sands believes that Luthor killed his parents for the insurance money then bribed the mechanic to falsify the records for a cut of the return. He goes to check up on an old friend, Harry, who worked for Luthor in the sixties, but is unaware that he is being followed. Harry tells Sands about his days working as Luthor's employee. He was involved in Air America which was a front to smuggle heroine to various states during the war. Luthor used it to get the capital to start a high tech company. He created the first designer drugs then showed the Dons how to set up labs all over the U.S. He then sold his formulas and distribution system for two million dollars under an alias, which made him rich.

Sands says he will interview a woman that used to work for and date Luthor in the seventies. Harry is then knocked down by a car and Sands sees two men pulling out guns so he runs away just as the police turn up. He visits the woman, Melissa Dugan. She tells him that she and Luthor became lovers until she saw him as he really was. Luthor used to own the Daily Planet and hired men to dig up incriminating evidence against his competitors and then run an article using this information before a government contract was awarded. Lexcorp would win the contract and the competitors would find themselves in a morass of lawsuits. She wanted to get out of the relationship and left Lexcorp for which Luthor never forgave her.

Sands goes home realizing that there is only one person who he can turn to for help as the police and government are most probably owned by Luthor. He then finds that his apartment has been ransacked. He concocts a way to get in touch with Superman through Clark Kent.

At the interview, Clark does not have an alibi. In a flashback, Sands answers a knock on the door and is sprayed with knock out gas by the same man who killed Harry. He is then taken to an office in a warehouse somewhere. Luthor is impressed by the information that Sands has managed to collect about him. He reveals that the tapes that Sands hid have already been erased and his notes have been incinerated. Luthor tells him that he cannot allow him to publish his book and he will be paid a kill fee. Sands asks if Luthor killed his parents, to which he replies that if Sands had known them he would have applauded his actions. He admits that he set up the insurance policy and had friends coerce the mechanic to make the alterations to their car.

Sands is then knock out again, dragged home and stabbed to death by the same man who took him before Luthor makes him writes "Clark Kent" on the floor. At the police station Clark still maintains that he is innocent. Then the commissioner, Macklin, enters and says that Clark is free to go as they have new evidence. A woman reports that the murder weapon has turned up bearing the fingerprints of a convicted felon named Edward Kelly who is wanted for assault and robbery. The position of Peter's hands also shows that he could not have written the blood message. The woman states that she is Clark's attorney despite Clark saying he does not have one. She explains that she was hired by Luthor to ensure that Clark is free and clear of the charge made against him.

References

1989 in comics
DC Comics one-shots